Daniel Warrender (born 28 April 1986) is an English footballer whose last known club was Ramsbottom United in the Northern Premier League Premier Division.

Warrender has previously played for Manchester City, in his hometown, and Blackpool. He also had a spell in America with San Francisco Seals.

On 13 September 2008, he made his first appearance for F.C. United of Manchester, in a goalless FA Cup first round qualifying match against Nantwich Town. He then played for the club for two seasons. He appeared 47 times for the club before leaving in December 2009 to take a break from football due to a hip injury.

He subsequently played for Ramsbottom United for a season between 2010 and 2011. He rejoined FC United in February 2012. In March 2012 he rejoined Ramsbottom United.

In the summer of 2014 he moved to Salford City. before quickly moving back to Ramsbottom United after the beginning of the season.

References

External links
Statistics for Blackpool

1986 births
Living people
Footballers from Manchester
English footballers
Association football defenders
Manchester City F.C. players
Blackpool F.C. players
Rossendale United F.C. players
San Francisco Seals (soccer) players
F.C. United of Manchester players
Ramsbottom United F.C. players
Salford City F.C. players
English Football League players
USL League Two players
Northern Premier League players
Expatriate soccer players in the United States
English expatriate sportspeople in the United States
English expatriate footballers